This is a list of the squads that qualified for the  2009 Champions League Twenty20.

New South Wales Blues 
Coach:  Matthew Mott

Victorian Bushrangers 
Coach:  Greg Shipperd

Sussex Sharks 
Coach:  Mark Robinson

Somerset Sabres
Coach:  Andrew Hurry

Deccan Chargers
Coach:  Darren Lehmann

Royal Challengers Bangalore
Coach:  Ray Jennings

Delhi Daredevils
Coach:  David Saker

Otago Volts
Coach:  Mike Hesson

Cape Cobras
Coach:  Shukri Conrad

Diamond Eagles

Wayamba
Coach:  Lanka de Silva

Trinidad & Tobago
Coach:  Kelvin Williams

References

External links
 2009 Champions League Twenty20 squads on ESPN CricInfo

Champions League Twenty20 squads